"I Should Have Cheated" is a song by American recording artist Keyshia Cole. It was written by 112 members Daron Jones and Quinnes "Q" Parker for her debut album, The Way It Is (2005), while production was helmed by Jones along with Ron Fair. The song was released on August 3, 2005 as the album's third single, following "I Changed My Mind" and "(I Just Want It) To Be Over." It rose to number four on US Billboards Hot R&B/Hip-Hop Songs chart and number 30 on the US Billboard Hot 100. Its music video made it to the top five on 106 and Park and remained there for 46 days.

Background
"I Should Have Cheated" was written by Daron Jones and Quinnes Parker, members of the R&B group 112. The  song is about a girl who suspects her boyfriend of cheating, but he also accuses her of the same; since she was not cheating, she thinks that she should have cheated on him. Originally recorded by and for R&B singer Nivea for her 2005 second album, Complicated, it was eventually handed over to Cole. When asked about how the song ended on her album, Cole elaborated in an interview with MTV News that "Daron did a song with Kelly Price that I was a big fan of [...] So I saw him at a video shoot one day and asked if I could work with him. I don't think it was really in my budget, but he got paid eventually, and it all worked out, which is great 'cause a lot of people like that don't work with new artists. So it was a blessing to actually work with him."

Chart performance
The single entered the US Billboard Hot 100 at number 85 and slowly moved up the charts, eventually peaking at number 30. "I Should Have Cheated" was a success in the urban community, peaking at number 4 in the Hot R&B/Hip-Hop Songs chart, and charted on the Hot Dance Club Play chart at number 11.

Live performances
On October 26, 2005, Cole was announced as a performer at the second annual 2005 Vibe Awards. In November, Cole performed "I Should Have Cheated" at the 2005 Vibe Awards, which was where she was nominated for three awards and went home with only one (the Next Award alongside rapper Young Jeezy) and it marked her first ever career award and nominations. Cole's performance of the song became a fan-favorite and was praised by critics, being described as "show-stopping" and "ghetto-fabulous" and also gained head nods from the famous audience members, most particularly Cole's idol Mary J. Blige.

Music video
Cole reunited with Benny Boom, director of her previous music video for "(I Just Want It) To Be Over," to film a visual for "I Should Have Cheated." Rapper Chink Santana is featured as Cole's boyfriend in the video. Rapper and friends Free as well as writer Daron Jones and Quinnes Parker also make appearances. In the clip, Cole finds bits of evidence that show her what her man is up to, because of various cell phone messages and movie stubs. As it unfolds, the video periodically cuts to Cole in a recording studio with 112's Daron and Q. When she confronts her boyfriend, he claims that she is the one who is cheating. Since she was faithful in the relationship, Keyshia deems that she should have cheated.

Track listings

Notes
  signifies an additional producer

Credits and personnel 
Credits adapted from the liner notes of The Way It Is.

Charlie Bisharat – violin
Keyshia Cole – arranger, vocals
Ron Fair – instruments, mixing engineer, producer
Tal Herzberg – nass, protools, engineer
Daron Jones – producer, writer
Quinnes "Q" Parker – writer

Charts

Weekly charts

Year-end charts

References

2005 singles
Keyshia Cole songs
Music videos directed by Benny Boom
Contemporary R&B ballads
2005 songs
A&M Records singles
Songs written by Daron Jones
Songs about infidelity
2000s ballads
Songs written by Quinnes Parker